Kazimierz Lejman (1907–1985) was a Polish dermatologist. He is credited with the histopathological description of late serpiginous syphilis.

Biography
Lejman was educated at the Jagiellonian University Medical College. In 1938, he moved to Vilnius, where he worked at the University of Stefan Batory. In 1944 he returned to Krakow and, after the death of Professor Walter, became the Head of the Department of Dermatology at the Jagiellonian University Medical College. He was interested in culture, art and ancient religions of the East. He was painting, poetry, writing historical sketches.
As a dermatologist was the author of works on syphilis and gonorrhea.

External links
 Biography and photographs

Polish dermatologists
1907 births
1985 deaths
Jagiellonian University alumni
20th-century Polish physicians